Air Raid Attack Act of 1942 was a United States federal statute authorizing the United States civil defense to protect Americans and property from bombing attacks, sabotage, and war hazards upon the United States entry into World War II. The Act of Congress established Civilian Defense regulations prohibiting the obstruction of the duties and rights of local districts, municipals, counties, and State officials.

Senate bill 1936 was passed by the 77th United States Congressional session and enacted into law by President Franklin Roosevelt on January 27, 1942.

Origins of the Air Raid Attack Act

The United States confronted espionage activities with the Federal Bureau of Investigation uncloaking the Duquesne Spy Ring in 1941 and Operation Pastorius in 1942.

Imperial Japanese Navy conducted maneuver warfare on the west coast of the United States in 1942. The continental Pacific coastline encountered the Imperial Japanese Naval forces with the battle of Los Angeles, bombardment of Ellwood, bombardment of Fort Stevens, and Lookout Air Raids.

The Empire of Japan discovered a gas balloon could travel thousands of miles if navigated by the Earth air current or jet stream. In 1933, Imperial Japanese Military commenced the design and development of the Fu-Go balloon bomb launching nine thousand hydrogen balloons from 1944 to 1945 for the purposes of firebombing the Western United States.

See also

References

Books

Historical Video Archives

External links
 
 
 

1942 in law
1942 in American law
77th United States Congress
World War II legislation